Tomislav Radotić (born 13 December 1981) is a Croatian retired football player and current manager. He is currently managing Cibalia Vinkovci.

Career
Product of the NK Osijek academy started his senior career in a string of 2nd and 3rd tier Croatian clubs based in the Osijek-Baranja County. He made his Prva HNL debut in 2006, aged 24, after signing for HNK Cibalia. Radotić was quick to establish himself in the club's first 11, remaining there for 6 seasons. Initially a defensive midfielder, he found himself more and more placed on right back, which would become his primary position in later years. His European competitions' debut was in the Europa League qualifiers in 2010, in games against Cliftonville F.C. After his contract with Cibalia ran out in the summer of 2012, he signed a two-year deal with RNK Split. In June 2015, Radotić signed a two-year contract with Osijek.

References

External links
 

Tomislav Radotić at Sportnet.hr 

1981 births
Living people
Sportspeople from Osijek
Association football fullbacks
Association football midfielders
Croatian footballers
NK Grafičar Vodovod players
NK Belišće players
NK Metalac Osijek players
HNK Cibalia players
RNK Split players
NK Osijek players
Second Football League (Croatia) players
First Football League (Croatia) players
Croatian Football League players
Croatian football managers
HNK Cibalia managers